Events from the year 1965 in the United States.

Incumbents

Federal Government 
 President: Lyndon B. Johnson (D-Texas)
 Vice President: vacant (until January 20), Hubert Humphrey (D-Minnesota) (starting January 20)
 Chief Justice: Earl Warren (California)
 Speaker of the House of Representatives: John William McCormack (D-Massachusetts)
 Senate Majority Leader: Mike Mansfield (D-Montana)
 Congress: 88th (until January 3), 89th (starting January 3)

Events

January

 January 1 – The ship S.S. Catala is driven onto the beach in Ocean Shores, Washington, stranding her.
 January 4 – President Lyndon B. Johnson proclaims his "Great Society" during his State of the Union Address.
 January 19 – The unmanned Gemini 2 is launched on a suborbital test of various spacecraft systems.
 January 20 – President Lyndon B. Johnson begins his full term. Hubert Humphrey is sworn in as Vice President of the United States.

February
 February 3 – The 8.7  Rat Islands earthquake affected southwest Alaska with a maximum Mercalli intensity of VI (Strong), causing a tsunami that was destructive at Amchitka.
 February 20 – Ranger 8 crashes into the Moon, after a successful mission of photographing possible landing sites for the Apollo program astronauts.
 February 21 – Malcolm X is assassinated in Manhattan.
 February 22 – A new, revised, color production of Rodgers and Hammerstein's Cinderella airs on CBS. Lesley Ann Warren makes her TV debut in the title role. The show becomes an annual tradition.

March
 March 2 – The Sound of Music premieres at the Rivoli Theater in New York City.
 March 7 – Bloody Sunday: Some 200 Alabama State Troopers clash with 525 civil rights demonstrators in Selma, Alabama. No one was killed in the clash.
 March 8 – Vietnam War: Some 3,500 United States Marines arrive in South Vietnam, becoming the first American combat troops in Vietnam.
 March 9 – The second attempt to march from Selma to Montgomery, Alabama, under the leadership of Martin Luther King Jr., stops at the bridge that was the site of Bloody Sunday, to hold a prayer service and return to Selma, in obedience to a court restraining order. White supremacists beat up white Unitarian Universalist minister James J. Reeb later that day in Selma.
 March 11 – White Unitarian Universalist minister James J. Reeb, beaten by White supremacists in Selma, Alabama on March 9 following the second march from Selma, dies in a hospital in Birmingham, Alabama.
 March 15 – President Lyndon B. Johnson makes his "We Shall Overcome" speech.
 March 16 – Police clash with 600 marchers from the Student Nonviolent Coordinating Committee (SNCC) in Montgomery, Alabama.
 March 17 
In Montgomery, Alabama, 1,600 civil rights marchers demonstrate at the Courthouse.
In response to the events of March 7 and 9 in Selma, Alabama, President Johnson sends a bill to Congress that forms the basis for the Voting Rights Act of 1965. It is passed by the Senate May 26, the House July 10, and signed into law by President Johnson August 6.
 March 18 – A United States federal judge rules that the Southern Christian Leadership Conference (SCLC) has the lawful right to march to Montgomery, Alabama to petition for 'redress of grievances'.
 March 19 – The wreck of the SS Georgiana, reputed to have been the most powerful Confederate cruiser ever built and owned by the real Rhett Butler, is discovered off the Isle of Palms, South Carolina, by teenage diver E. Lee Spence, exactly 102 years after she was sunk with a million dollar cargo while attempting to run past the Union blockade into Charleston.
 March 21 
Ranger program: NASA launches Ranger 9, which is the last in a series of unmanned lunar space probes.Martin Luther King Jr. leads 3,200 Civil rights activists in the third march from Selma, Alabama, to the capitol in Montgomery.
 March 23 – Gemini 3: NASA launches the United States' first 2-person crew (Gus Grissom, John Young) into Earth orbit.
 March 25 – Martin Luther King Jr. and 25,000 civil rights activists successfully end the 4-day march from Selma, Alabama, to the capitol in Montgomery.
 March 30 – Funeral services are held for Detroit homemaker Viola Liuzzo, who was shot dead by four Klansmen as she drove marchers back to Selma at night after the civil rights march.
 March
 The Negro Family: The Case For National Action government report issued.
 First African American Playboy Playmate, model Jennifer Jackson.

April
 April 3 – The world's first space nuclear power reactor, SNAP-10A, is launched by the United States from Vandenberg AFB, California. The reactor operated for 43 days and remains in high earth orbit.
 April 5 – At the 37th Academy Awards, George Cukor's My Fair Lady wins 8 Academy Awards, including Best Picture and Best Director for Cukor. Rex Harrison wins an Oscar for Best Actor. Robert Stevenson's Mary Poppins takes home 5 Oscars out of 13 nominations. Julie Andrews wins an Academy Award for Best Actress, for her portrayal in the lead role. Sherman Brothers receives 2 Oscars including Best Song, "Chim Chim Cher-ee". The ceremony is hosted by Bob Hope at Santa Monica Civic Auditorium.
 April 9 
In Houston, Texas, the Harris County Domed Stadium (more commonly known as the Astrodome) opens.
 Charlie Brown and the Peanuts Gang appear on the cover of Time.
The 100th anniversary of the end of the American Civil War is observed.
 April 11 – The Palm Sunday tornado outbreak of 1965: An estimated 51 tornadoes (47 confirmed) hit in 6 Midwestern states, killing between 256 and 271 people and injuring some 1,500 more.
 April 14 – In Cold Blood killers Richard Hickock and Perry Smith, convicted of murdering 4 members of the Herbert Clutter family of Holcomb, Kansas, are executed by hanging at the Kansas State Penitentiary for Men in Lansing, Kansas.
 April 17 – The first SDS march against the Vietnam War draws 25,000 protestors to Washington, DC.
 April 21 – The New York World's Fair in Flushing Meadows reopens.
 April 25 – Sixteen-year-old sniper Michael Clark kills 3 and wounds others, shooting at cars from a hilltop along Highway 101 just south of Orcutt, California. Clark kills himself as police rush the hilltop.
 April 28 – U.S. troops are sent to the Dominican Republic by President Lyndon B. Johnson, "for the stated purpose of protecting U.S. citizens and preventing an alleged Communist takeover of the country", thus thwarting the possibility of "another Cuba".
 April 29 – 8 The 6.7  Puget Sound earthquake affected western Washington with a maximum Mercalli intensity of VIII (Severe), causing seven deaths and $12.5–28 million in financial losses in the Puget Sound region.

May
 May 5 – Forty men burn their draft cards at the University of California, Berkeley, and a coffin is marched to the Berkeley Draft Board.
 May 6 – A tornado outbreak near the Twin Cities in Minnesota kills 13 and injures 683.
 May 7 – The U.S. Steel freighter  collides with the SS Topdalsfjord and sinks near the Mackinac Bridge, killing 25 of those on board.
 May 21 – The largest teach-in to date begins at Berkeley, California, attended by 30,000.
 May 22 – The first skateboard championship is held. In addition, several hundred Vietnam War protesters in Berkeley, CA, march to the Draft Board again to burn 19 more cards. Lyndon Johnson is hanged in effigy.
 May 31 – Scottish racing driver Jim Clark wins the Indianapolis 500, and later wins the Formula One world driving championship in the same year.

June
 June 1 – Florida International University is founded in Miami.
 June 3 – Gemini 4: Astronaut Ed White makes the first U.S. space walk.
 June 16 – A planned anti-war protest at The Pentagon becomes a teach-in, with demonstrators distributing 50,000 leaflets in and around the building.
 June 25 – A U.S. Air Force Boeing C135-A bound for Okinawa crashes just after takeoff at MCAS El Toro in Orange County, California, killing all 85 on board.
 June 28 – The DeFeo family moves from Brooklyn, New York, to 112 Ocean Avenue in Amityville, Long Island, New York. The murder of all but one of the DeFeos nine years later, on November 13, 1974, by the oldest son, Ronald/Ronnie "Butch" DeFeo Jr., and the subsequent claims of a haunting at 112 Ocean Avenue by the Lutz family, would lead to The Amityville Horror franchise of books and movies.

July
 July 13
Environmental Science Services Administration created (combining Coast & Geodetic Survey and Weather Bureau)
Weather Bureau part of Environmental Science Services Administration.
 July 14 – U.S. spacecraft Mariner 4 flies by Mars, becoming the first spacecraft to return images from the Red Planet.
 July 20 – Rock musician Bob Dylan's influential single "Like a Rolling Stone" is released by Columbia Records.
 July 25 – Electric Dylan controversy: Bob Dylan elicits controversy among folk purists by "going electric" at the Newport Folk Festival.
 July 28 – Vietnam War: U.S. President Lyndon B. Johnson announces his order to increase the number of United States troops in South Vietnam from 75,000 to 125,000, and to double the number of men drafted per month from 17,000 to 35,000.
 July 30 – War on Poverty: U.S. President Lyndon B. Johnson signs the Social Security Act of 1965 into law, establishing Medicare and Medicaid.

August
 August 6 – U.S. President Lyndon B. Johnson signs the Voting Rights Act of 1965 into law, outlawing literacy tests and other discriminatory voting practices that have been responsible for widespread disfranchisement of African Americans.
 August 9 – An explosion at an Arkansas missile plant kills 53.
 August 11 – The Watts Riots begin in Los Angeles, California.
 August 13 – The rock group Jefferson Airplane debuts at the Matrix in San Francisco, California and begins to appear there regularly.
 August 15 – The Beatles perform the first stadium concert in the history of rock, playing at Shea Stadium in New York City.
 August 18 – Vietnam War – Operation Starlite: 5,500 United States Marines destroy a Viet Cong stronghold on the Van Tuong peninsula in Quang Ngai Province, in the first major American ground battle of the war. The Marines were tipped-off by a Viet Cong deserter who said that there was an attack planned against the U.S. base at Chu Lai.
 August 20 – Jonathan Myrick Daniels, an Episcopal seminarian from Keene, New Hampshire, is murdered in Hayneville, Alabama while working in the American civil rights movement.
 August 21 – Gemini 5 (Gordon Cooper, Pete Conrad) is launched on the first 1-week flight, as well as the first test of fuel cells for electrical power.
 August 26 – President Johnson announces an end to the draft deferment for newly married men. Effective at midnight, all men who are not married will remain eligible for the draft regardless of their marital status. 
 August 28 – The first Subway opens in Bridgeport, Connecticut.
 August 30 
Rock musician Bob Dylan releases his influential album Highway 61 Revisited, featuring the song "Like a Rolling Stone."
Casey Stengel announces his retirement after 55 years in baseball.

September
 September 1 – WTWO begins broadcasting in Terre Haute, Indiana.
 September 7 – Vietnam War: In a follow-up to August's Operation Starlite, United States Marines and South Vietnamese forces initiate Operation Piranha on the Batangan Peninsula, 23 miles south of the Chu Lai Marine base.
 September 9 
Sandy Koufax pitches a perfect game in a baseball match against the Chicago Cubs. The opposing pitcher, Bob Hendley, allows only 1 run, which is unearned.
Hurricane Betsy roars ashore near New Orleans, Louisiana with winds of 145 MPH, causing 76 deaths and $1.42 billion in damage. The storm is the first hurricane to cause $1 billion in unadjusted damages, giving it the nickname "Billion Dollar Betsy". It is the last major hurricane to strike New Orleans until Hurricane Katrina 40 years later.
The Department of Housing and Urban Development (HUD) begins operation.
September 14 – The infamous "bad sitcom" My Mother The Car premieres on NBC.
September 18 – The first ever Mr. Olympia bodybuilding competition is held at the Brooklyn Academy of Music in New York City and is won by Larry Scott.
 September 25 – The Tom & Jerry cartoon series makes its world broadcast premiere on CBS.
 September 28 – Fidel Castro announces that anyone who wants to can emigrate to the United States.

October

 October 3 – U.S. President Lyndon B. Johnson signs an immigration bill which abolishes quotas based on national origin.
 October 4 
Pope Paul VI visits the United States. He appears for a Mass in Yankee Stadium and makes a speech at the United Nations.
The University of California, Irvine opens its doors.
 October 7 – Seven Japanese fishing boats are sunk off Guam by super typhoon Carmen; 209 are killed.
 October 9 – Yale University presents the Vinland map.
 October 10 – The first group of Cuban refugees travels to the U.S.
 October 14 – The Los Angeles Dodgers defeat the Minnesota Twins, 4 games to 3, to win their 4th World Series Title. 
 October 15 – Opposition to United States involvement in the Vietnam War: The Catholic Worker Movement stages an anti-war protest in Manhattan. One protestor who carries out a draft-card burning, David J. Miller, is arrested, the first under the new amendment to the Military Selective Service Act.
 October 16 – Anti-war protests draw 100,000 in 80 U.S. cities and around the world.
 October 17 – The New York World's Fair at Flushing Meadows, New York, closes. Due to financial losses, some of the projected site park improvements fail to materialize.
 October 26 – Police discover the body of Sylvia Likens in Indianapolis, Indiana.
 October 28 – In St. Louis, Missouri, the 630-foot-tall parabolic steel Gateway Arch is completed.
 October 29 – An 80-kiloton nuclear device is detonated at Amchitka Island, Alaska as part of the Vela Uniform program, code-named Project Long Shot.
 October 30 
Vietnam War: Near Da Nang, United States Marines repel an intense attack by Viet Cong forces, killing 56 guerrillas. Among the dead, a sketch of Marine positions is found on the body of a 13-year-old Vietnamese boy who sold drinks to the Marines the day before.
In Washington, D.C., a pro-Vietnam War march draws 25,000.

November
 November 2 
Quaker Norman Morrison sets himself on fire outside the Pentagon to protest United States involvement in the Vietnam War.
Liberal Republican John Lindsay is elected mayor of New York City.
 November 6 – Freedom Flights begin: Cuba and the United States formally agree to start an airlift for Cubans who want to go to the United States (by 1971 250,000 Cubans take advantage of this program).
 November 7 – The Pillsbury Company's mascot, the Pillsbury Doughboy, is created.
 November 8
Vietnam War: During Operation Hump, medic Lawrence Joel becomes the first African American since the Spanish–American War to receive the United States Medal of Honor.  
American Airlines Flight 383 crashes on approach to Cincinnati, killing 58 of 62 people on board.
The soap opera Days of Our Lives debuts on NBC.
 November 9 
Northeast Blackout of 1965: Several U.S. states (Vermont, New Hampshire, Massachusetts, Connecticut, Rhode Island, New York and portions of New Jersey) and parts of Canada are hit by a series of blackouts lasting up to 13½ hours.
Vietnam War: In New York City, 22-year-old Catholic Worker Movement member Roger Allen LaPorte sets himself on fire in front of the United Nations building in protest of the war.
 November 14 – Vietnam War: Battle of the Ia Drang – In the Ia Drang Valley of the Central Highlands in Vietnam, the first major engagement of the war between regular United States and North Vietnamese forces begins.
 November 15 – U.S. racer Craig Breedlove sets a new land speed record of 600.601 mph on Bonneville Salt Flats.
 November 22 – Man of La Mancha opens in a Greenwich Village theatre in New York City and eventually becomes one of the greatest musical hits of all time, winning a Tony Award for its star, Richard Kiley.
 November 27 
Tens of thousands of Vietnam War protesters picket the White House, then march on the Washington Monument.
Vietnam War: The Pentagon tells U.S. President Lyndon B. Johnson that if planned major sweep operations to neutralize Viet Cong forces during the next year are to succeed, the number of American troops in Vietnam will have to be increased from 120,000 to 400,000.
 November 28 – Vietnam War: In response to U.S. President Lyndon B. Johnson's call for "more flags" in Vietnam, Philippines President-elect Ferdinand Marcos announces he will send troops to help fight in South Vietnam.
 November 30 – Ralph Nader's book Unsafe at Any Speed: The Designed-In Dangers of the American Automobile is published.

December
 December 9 – A Charlie Brown Christmas, the first Peanuts television special, debuts on CBS. It becomes a Christmas tradition.
 December 15 – Gemini 6 and Gemini 7 perform the first controlled rendezvous in Earth orbit.
 December 17 – The British government begins an oil embargo against Rhodesia; the United States joins the effort.
 December 21 – A new, 1-hour German-American production of The Nutcracker'', with an international cast that includes Edward Villella in the title role, makes its U.S. TV debut. It is repeated annually by CBS over the next 3 years, but after that, it is virtually forgotten.

Undated
 Jenny and Sylvia Likens are left in the care of Indianapolis housewife Gertrude Baniszewski. Sylvia is found dead and mutilated 3 months later.
 Tokyo officially becomes the largest city of the world, taking the lead from New York City.

Ongoing
 Cold War (1947–1991)
 Space Race (1957–1975)
 Vietnam War, U.S. involvement (1964–1973)

Births
 January 1 
Terri Sewell, African-American lawyer and politician
John A. Sullivan, real estate agent and politician
Andrew Valmon, runner and coach
 January 2 
 Curt Hagman, Mayor of Chino Hills  
 Greg Swindell, baseball player and coach
 January 3 – Sharrie Williams, blues and gospel singer-songwriter
 January 4 – Rick Hearst, actor
 January 5 – Ricky Paull Goldin, actor
 January 6 – Cynthia Dill, lawyer, Member of the Maine Senate from the 7th District
 January 7 
 Matthew Levatich, businessman, president of Harley-Davidson
 John Ondrasik (Five for Fighting), singer-songwriter
 January 8 – Maria Pitillo, actress 
 January 9 – Jamie Callender, politician, member of the Ohio House of Representatives
 January 10 – Butch Hartman, animator, writer, producer, director, voice actor, and YouTuber
 January 11 – Mark Halperin, journalist
 January 13 
 Rod Rosenstein, officeholder (Deputy Attorney General) and lawyer 
 Kevin Samuels, Internet personality and image consultant (died 2022)
 January 17 – Jim Holt (Arkansas politician), American politician, Arkansas House of Representatives 
 January 19 – J. B. Pritzker, businessman, philanthropist, politician, and the 43rd governor of Illinois
 January 21 – Michele Ruiz, entrepreneur
 January 22 – Diane Lane, actress
 January 24
 Mike Awesome, professional wrestler (d. 2007)
 William Derrough, investment banker 
 January 27 – Tim Chambers, college baseball coach (died 2019)
 January 28 – Robert von Dassanowsky, academic, writer, poet, film and cultural historian and producer
 January 30 – Julie McCullough, actress 
 January 31
 Cindy Ambuehl, actress 
 John L. Brownlee, attorney
 Peter Sagal, NPR host
 February 2 – Cady Huffman, actress  
 February 3
Kathleen Kinmont, actress, producer and screenwriter
Maura Tierney, actress and producer
 February 4 
 Jerome Brown, American football player (died 1992)
 Julianne Buescher, actress and voice actress 
 February 5 – Ken LaCorte, executive at Fox News Channel
 February 6
 Jim Christian, basketball coach  
 Dana Eskelson, television actress  
 February 7 – Chris Rock, African-American comedian and actor
 February 9 
 Michael Brandon, gay pornographic actor and director 
 Stephin Merritt, singer-songwriter and multi-instrumentalist
 February 10 – David Aldridge, writer 
 February 13 – Andy Buckley, actor
 February 14 – Donald DeGrood, Roman Catholic bishop
 February 19
 Clark Hunt, CEO of the Kansas City Chiefs 
 Jon Fishman, drummer  
 February 20
 Matt Bartle, politician   
 Ron Eldard, actor  
 February 21 – Shawn Slocum, American football coach  
 February 22
 Chris Dudley, basketball player and politician
 Dean Karr, director and photographer
 Pat LaFontaine, ice hockey player
 February 23
 Kristin Davis, actress
 Michael Dell, computer manufacturer
 February 24 – Jane Swift, executive, former governor of Massachusetts   
 February 26 – Tim Armstead, Republican politician and jurist from West Virginia
 March 2 – Ron Gant, news anchor 
 March 3 – Tom Brower, politician
 March 4 – Stacy Edwards, actress
 March 5 – Kathleen Delaney, actress
 March 6 – Lora Leigh, novelist
 March 7 – E. E. Knight, science fiction writer 
 March 8 – Kenny Smith, basketball player  
 March 9 – Benito Santiago, baseball player
 March 10
 Randy Weiner, playwright, producer and theater and nightclub owner  
 Rod Woodson, American football player 
 March 11
 Jesse Jackson Jr., African-American politician
 Wallace Langham, actor  
 Andy Sturmer, musician, singer, songwriter, and composer  
 March 12 – Steve Finley, baseball player  
 March 13 – Gigi Rice, actress 
 March 14 – Kevin Brown, baseball player 
 March 15 – Carl J. Artman, politician  
 March 16 – Angela Taylor, athlete and collegiate coach
 March 17 – George Hinkle, American football player  
 March 18 – Shannon Grove, politician 
 March 19
 Joseph D. Kucan, video game developer 
 Jeff Pidgeon, animator and voice actor 
 March 22 – Rick Harrison, businessman 
 March 24 – The Undertaker, professional wrestler and actor
 March 25
 Avery Johnson, basketball player and coach
 Sarah Jessica Parker, actress
 March 30 – Juliet Landau, actress and producer
 March 31 
 Steve Bing, businessman, philanthropist and film producer (suicide 2020)
 William McNamara, film actor
 April 1 – Mark Jackson, basketball coach
 April 2 – Rodney King, convicted criminal and police brutality victim (died 2012)
 April 4 – Robert Downey Jr., actor and producer
 April 7 – Bill Bellamy, actor and comedian  
 April 12
 Tom O'Brien, actor-producer  
 Jonathan Fahn, voice actor  
 April 14 – Kirk Windstein, musician 
 April 16
 Jon Cryer, actor, comedian and television director
 Martin Lawrence, African-American actor, comedian, and producer
 April 17 – William Mapother, actor
 April 23 – Tommy DeCarlo, singer and songwriter  
 April 25 – Eric Avery, musician
 April 28 – Karl Logan, musician
 May 9 – Lisa Colagrossi, journalist (died 2015)
 May 13
 Tim Chapman, bounty hunter 
 Lari White, country singer (died 2018) 
 May 16 – Krist Novoselic, rock bassist (Nirvana) 
 May 19 – Maile Flanagan, actress
 May 20 – Ted Allen, author and television personality 
 Billy Donovan, basketball coach  
 May 27 – Todd Bridges, actor and comedian
 June 2 – Jim Knipfel, journalist and author
 June 3
Jeff Blumenkrantz, actor and composer
Mike Gordon, rock singer, bass player and director 
 Mike Shula, American football coach
 June 7 – Mick Foley, pro wrestler
 June 8
 Chris Chavis ("Tatanka"), professional wrestler
 Frank Grillo, American actor 
 Kevin Farley, American actor 
 Kevin Ritz, American baseball pitcher  
 June 10 – Scott Graham, sportscaster 
 June 11 – Pamela Gidley, actress and model (died 2018)
 June 16 – Andrea M. Ghez, astronomer, recipient of the Nobel Prize in Physics in 2020
 June 21 – Michael Dolan, theatre and film actor, director and educator
 June 22
 Just-Ice, rapper
 J. J. Cohen, actor 
 June 23 – Sylvia Mathews Burwell, government 
 June 24 – Chris Barnes, child actor
 June 26 – Randy Hembrey, Road Racing director
 June 28 – Sonny Strait, voice actor and director
 June 30
 Mitch Richmond, basketball player
 Bobby Vitale, pornographic actor
 July 1 – Tom Hodges, actor and film producer  
 July 4
 Horace Grant, basketball player 
 Harvey Grant, basketball player 
 Jay Crawford, sports journalist 
 July 7 
 Sam Holbrook, baseball player and umpire
 Karen Malina White, actress
 July 8
 Lee Tergesen, actor  
 Corey Parker, actor and coach 
 July 10 – Alec Mapa, actor, comedian and writer  
 July 15
 Scott Livingstone, baseball player 
 Bobby Gustafson, guitarist 
 July 16
 Billy Mitchell, video game player  
 Daryl Mitchell, African-American actor  
 Sherri Stoner, actress, producer, and screenwriter
 July 18
 Michael Sharrett, actor 
 Jim Bob Duggar, real estate agent, politician, and television personality 
 July 19
 Clea Lewis, actress and singer
 Stuart Scott, sports reporter and ESPN anchor (died 2015)
 July 20 – Anthony Shriver, activist
 July 21 – Tom Gulager, actor 
 July 22 – Shawn Michaels, professional wrestler and actor 
 July 24
 Brian Blades, National Football League wide receiver
 Kadeem Hardison, actor and director
 Doug Liman, director and producer
 July 25 – Illeana Douglas, actress and producer
 August 11
 Viola Davis, African-American actress
 Duane Martin, actor
 August 13 – Deborah Falconer, actress
 August 14 – Terry Richardson, fashion photographer
 August 15 – Rob Thomas, author, producer, director and screenwriter
 August 18 – Bob Harper, personal trainer and author
 August 19
 Kevin Dillon, actor
 Kyra Sedgwick, actress
 August 24
 Dee Harvey, R&B singer (died 2012) 
 Reggie Miller, basketball player and commentator
 August 26 – Bobby Duncum Jr., American professional wrestler (died 2000)  
 August 27
 Lynn Shelton, filmmaker (died 2020)
 Scott Dibble, politician and activist
 LeRoy Homer Jr., airline pilot (died 2001)
 September 9
 Dan Majerle, basketball player
 Charles Esten, actor
 Constance Marie, actress
 September 11 – Paul Heyman, wrestling promoter, ECW<ref"></ref>
 September 13 – Jeff Ross, stand-up comedian, writer, and actor
 September 18 – Tim Scott, U.S. Senator from South Carolina from 2013
 September 28 – Scott Fellows,  animator
 September 30
 Kathleen Madigan, comedian
 Daron Norwood, country singer (died 2015)
 October 1 – J. Paul Oetken, judge
 October 4
 John Melendez, television announcer
 Micky Ward, boxer
 October 6 – Steve Scalise, House majority whip and U.S. Representative of Louisiana's 1st district
 October 10 – Chris Penn, actor (died 2006)
 October 11 
 Bobby Wayne Woods, convicted murderer, kidnapper and rapist (died 2009)
 Julianne McNamara, artistic gymnast
 October 13 – Bill Odenkirk, comedy writer
 October 18 – Curtis Stigers, jazz vocalist and saxophonist
 October 27 – Chad Larson American-Canadian rock guitarist
 November 6 – Greg Graffin, rock singer (Bad Religion) 
 November 12 – Lex Lang, voice actor and director
 November 13 – Kurt Marshall, model and actor (died 1988)
 November 20 – Mike D, rapper (Beastie Boys) 
 November 21 – Bill Oberst Jr., actor  
 November 22 – Wendy Moten, singer
 November 23 – Don Frye, professional wrestler and mixed martial arts fighter
 November 25 
 Tim Armstrong, singer-songwriter, guitarist, and producer 
 Cris Carter, American football player
 November 30 – Ben Stiller, actor, screenwriter, film director and producer, son of Jerry Stiller and Anne Meara, brother of Amy Stiller and spouse of Christine Taylor
 December 2 – Dan Gauthier, actor
 December 4 – Veronica Taylor, voice actress
 December 10 – J Mascis, rock singer, guitarist and drummer 
 December 14
 Madeline Amy Sweeney, flight attendant (died 2001)
 Craig Biggio, baseball player
 Ted Raimi, actor, producer and writer
 December 15 –Ted Slampyak, comic strip cartoonist 
 December 22 – Lee Rogers Berger American-born explorer and paleoanthropologist
 December 23 – Martin Kratt, zoologist and educational nature show host
 December 30
 Heidi Fleiss, madam
 Kelli Maroney, actress
 December 31
 Nicholas Sparks, author

Deaths
 January 12 – Lorraine Hansberry, African American playwright and writer (born 1930)
 January 14 – Jeanette MacDonald, actress and singer (born 1903)
 January 20 – Alan Freed, disc jockey (born 1922)
 February 5 – Irving Bacon, actor (born 1893)
 February 11 – Loyal Blaine Aldrich, astronomer (born 1884)
 February 15 – Nat King Cole, singer and musician (born 1919)
 February 19
 Forrest Taylor, actor (born 1883)
 Tom Wilson, actor (born 1880)
 February 21 – Malcolm X, African American Muslim minister and human rights activist (born 1925)
 March 14 – Marion Jones Farquhar, tennis player (born 1879)
 March 17 – Quentin Reynolds, journalist (born 1902)
 March 25 – Wolfgang Klemperer, Austrian American scientist and engineer (born 1893 in Germany)
 March 30 – Philip Showalter Hench, physician, recipient of the Nobel Prize in Physiology or Medicine in 1950 (born 1896)
 June 2 – Nannie Doss, serial killer (born 1905)
 July 14 – Adlai Stevenson II, politician (born 1900)
 August 31 – E. E. "Doc" Smith, science-fiction writer (born 1890)
 October 1 – Anton Boisen, founder of the clinical pastoral education movement (born 1876)
 October 2 – Nicky Arnstein, professional gambler and con artist, married to Fanny Brice (born 1879)
 October 26 – Sylvia Likens, murder victim (born 1949)
 November 18 – Henry A. Wallace, 33rd Vice President of the United States from 1941 to 1945 (born 1888)
 December 5 – Joseph Erlanger, physiologist and academic, Nobel Prize laureate (born 1874)
 December 28 – Lynn Thorndike, historian of medieval science and alchemy (born 1882)

See also 
 List of American films of 1965
 Timeline of United States history (1950–1969)

References

External links
 

 
1960s in the United States
United States
United States
Years of the 20th century in the United States